The following radio stations broadcast on AM frequency 1530 kHz: 1530 AM is a United States clear-channel frequency. KFBK Sacramento and WCKY Cincinnati share Class A status on 1530 AM.

Angola 
 D3RW in Cabinda

Argentina 
 LRJ200 in Morteros, Cordoba
 Esencia in San Miguel, Buenos Aires

Australia 
 2VM in Moree, NSW
 ARDS in Darwin, NT

Bolivia 
 CP111 in San Borja
 CP200 in Llica

Chile 
 CA-153 in Copiapo
 CB-153 in Quillota
 CC-153 in Coronel
 CD-153 in Calbuco
 CD-153 in Chile Chico

China 
 Zhejiang News Radio  in Hangzhou

Colombia 
 HJDN in Medellín
 HKN70 in Murindó
 HJD26 in San Pedro de Urabá
 HJGD in Chiquinquirá
 HKR73 in Guapi
 HJOZ in San Juan del Cesar
 HKV82 in Puerto Lleras
 HJEU in Sevilla (formerly HJJB)
 HJPE in Melgar

Cuba 
 CMIX in Moron, Ciego de Ávila.

Ecuador 
 HCJY1 in La Concordia
 HCMC2 in Libertad
 HCMZ6 in Pelileo
 HCNI4 in San Lorenzo
 HCVP5 in Pallatanga
 HCCC5 in Azogues

Iceland 
 TFK in Keflavik

Indonesia 
 PM2B... in Jakarta
 PM3EXB in Kupang

Iran 
 EPE-... in Yazd

Mexico 
 XESD-AM in León, Guanajuato, licensed in Silao, Guanajuato
 XEUR-AM in Mexico City

New Zealand 
 ZL2YP in Bell Block / Taranaki / Pakipaki

Peru 
 OBZ4S in Huayucachi

Philippines 
 DZME in Metro Manila

Portugal

Madeira
 CSB91 in Funchal

Rwanda 
 9XG in Gitarama

Thailand 
 HSJZ-AM in Uttaradit

United States 
Stations in bold are clear-channel stations.

Vatican City 
 HV100 in Santa Maria di Galeria

Uruguay 
 CX50 in Montevideo
 CX153 in Nueva Palmir

References

Lists of radio stations by frequency